Bucculatrix cantabricella is a moth in the family Bucculatricidae. It was described by Pierre Chrétien in 1898. It is found in the western and central Mediterranean region, east to Slovakia and North Macedonia.

The wingspan is 7–8 mm.

The larvae feed on Convolvulus cantabrica. They mine the leaves of their host plant. Larvae can be found in June. The species probably overwinters in the pupal stage.

References

Arctiidae genus list at Butterflies and Moths of the World of the Natural History Museum

External links
 Images representing Bucculatrix cantabricella at Consortium for the Barcode of Life

Bucculatricidae
Leaf miners
Moths described in 1898
Moths of Europe